Duck Maze is a puzzle-platform game developed and published by Bit Corporation in 1987, making it the first Nintendo unlicensed game released for Famicom (internationally known as NES). The title was later published in 1990 by HES and Dismac, respectively in Australia and Brazil.

Gameplay
Duck Maze is a clone of Doki Doki Penguin Land by Sega, originally released in 1985 on SG-1000 and MSX, in which the player control a duck to guide an egg downwards of  its 20 levels by moving or destroying blocks. Furthermore, one of the three lives available can be lost when this egg touch an enemy or when it breaks down falling too high.

External links
 Duck Maze at GameFAQs

1987 video games
Bit Corporation games
Nintendo Entertainment System games
Single-player video games
Unauthorized video games
Video game clones
Video games developed in Taiwan